Trapania vitta is a species of sea slug, a dorid nudibranch, a marine gastropod mollusc in the family Goniodorididae.

Distribution
This species was described from Bali, Indonesia with additional material from Luzon, Philippines. It has also been reported from Queensland, East Timor and Vanuatu.

Description
The body of this goniodorid nudibranch is opaque white. The gills and rhinophores are white with orange tips and the lateral papillae are entirely white. The oral tentacles are orange and there is usually an orange line extending from the tip of the tail partway towards the gills. The coloration is similar to Trapania aurata except that in that species the lateral papillae are tipped with orange. Trapania gibbera is another species which is mainly white.

Ecology
Trapania vitta probably feeds on Entoprocta which often grow on sponges and other living substrata.

References

External links
 

Goniodorididae
Gastropods described in 2008